Kandu may refer to:
 Kandu, Hamadan
 Kandu, Qazvin

See also
 Gandu, Iran (disambiguation)